The 2015–16 Sam Houston State Bearkats men's basketball team represented Sam Houston State University during the 2015–16 NCAA Division I men's basketball season. The Bearkats, led by sixth year head coach Jason Hooten, played their home games at the Bernard Johnson Coliseum and were members of the Southland Conference. They finished the season 18–16, 12–6 in Southland play to finish in a tie for third place. They defeated Nicholls State in the quarterfinals of the Southland tournament to advance to the semifinals where they lost to Texas A&M–Corpus Christi. They were invited to the CollegeInsider.com Tournament where they lost in the first round to Jackson State.

Preseason
The Bearkats were picked to finish fourth (4th) in both the Southland Conference Coaches' Poll and the Sports Information Directors Poll.

Roster

Schedule
Source:
Access Date: November 15, 2015

|-
!colspan=9 style="background:#FF7F00; color:#FFFFFF;"| Non-Conference regular season

|-
!colspan=9 style="background:#FF7F00; color:#FFFFFF;"|Southland regular season

|-
!colspan=9 style="background:#FF7F00; color:#FFFFFF;"| Southland tournament

|-
!colspan=9 style="background:#FF7F00; color:#FFFFFF;"| CIT

See also
2015–16 Sam Houston State Bearkats women's basketball team

References

Sam Houston Bearkats men's basketball seasons
Sam Houston State
Sam Houston State Bearkats basketball
Sam Houston State Bearkats basketball
Sam Houston State